Zhu Qinglai (born 1881 in Shanghai) was a politician in the Republic of China. He was an important politician during the Wang Jingwei regime (Republic of China-Nanjing. His given name was Xiang, but he was better known by his art-name Qinglai. He disappeared after the collapse of the Wang Jingwei regime.

Biography 
Zhu Qinglai went to Japan to study commerce, industry and economics Later he returned to China, he held positions in the Ministry of Agriculture and Commerce and in the Ministry of Finance. He established Shenzhou University, and became its General Manager. He also became editor of the "Weekly Banking Magazine" and a professor at Shanghai Daxia University, Chizhi University, Guanghua University and Zhongguo Gongxue.

In 1934 Zhu Qinglai became a member of the Chinese National Socialist Party. After the Second Sino-Japanese War had broken out, he advocated opposition to the Second United Front in one Shanghai magazine.

In 1940 Zhu Qinglai participated in the Reorganized National Government of China and entered the Kuomintang (Wang's clique). He became Member of the Kuomintang's Central Political Commission and Minister for Transport of the Wang Jingwei Government. In next August he became Executive Member of the National Economic Council and Chairman of the Irrigation Commission. In August 1943 he was promoted to be Vice-Chief of the Legislative Yuan.

Zhu's whereabouts have been unknown since the collapse of the Wang Jingwei government.

Footnotes 
 

 
 

Republic of China politicians from Shanghai
Chinese collaborators with Imperial Japan
1881 births
Year of death uncertain
China Democratic Socialist Party politicians